Franconian or Frankish is a collective term traditionally used by linguists to refer to many West Germanic languages, some of which are spoken in what formed the historical core area of Francia during the Early Middle Ages. Linguistically, there are no typological features that are typical for all the various dialects conventionally grouped as Franconian. As such, it forms a residual category within the larger historical West Germanic dialect continuum rather than a homogeneous group of closely related dialects. For most of the varieties grouped under the term "Franconian", the diachronical connection to the Frankish language, which was spoken by the Franks, is unclear.

Franconian is further divided along the lines of the High German consonant shift, with Low Franconian (including Dutch and Afrikaans) not participating whereas the Central Franconian (which includes Luxembourgish) did, to varying degrees.

Both the term Franconian and its further delineations are restricted in their use to linguists and are not used as an endonym by any speakers of the Franconian group; except for East Franconian German, which is called Fränkisch by its speakers, though this is caused by the dialect being spoken in the region of Franconia.

Terminology
The term Frankish or Franconian (High German: Fränkisch) as a modern linguistic category was coined by the German linguist Wilhelm Braune (1850–1926) who used it as a term to designate historical West Germanic texts which he could not readily classify as belonging to either Saxon, Alemannic or Bavarian. He divided it into Low, Middle and High Franconian (Nieder-, Mittel- and Oberfränkisch).

The practice of alluding to tribal names from the Migration Period when naming dialect groups during the early stages of Germanic Philology was not restricted to Germany: 19th-century Dutch linguists also conventionally divided the Germanic varieties spoken in the Netherlands and Belgium into Frisian, Saxon, and Frankish varieties. In both cases, linguistic borders of historical ancestor dialects were, at the time, thought to closely mirror the supposed tribal duchies of the Frankish Empire at the start of the Early Middle Ages.

Earlier use of "Franconian/Frankish" as a linguistic category can be found. For example, Dutch linguist Jan van Vliet (1622–1666) used Francica or Francks. According to van Vliet, Francks descended from oud Teuts (ancient Germanic). Similarly, the scholar Franciscus Junius was said to have collected fragments of vetere Francica ad illustrandam linguam patriam (in Old Frankish, for the elucidation of the mother tongue) in 1694.

Definition
The term "Franconian" refers to a collection of dialects, and not to a language. As a residual category, Franconian is defined by what it is not, rather than what it is in and of itself. While a descriptive definition of Franconian as a whole does not exist, its internal subdivisions can be defined and contrasted, both with one another and other large dialect groupings.

Divisions of Franconian

Low Franconian

Low Franconian, Low Frankish, or Netherlandic is a linguistic category used to classify many historical and contemporary West Germanic varieties closely related to, and including, the Dutch language. Most dialects and languages included within the category are spoken in the Netherlands, northern Belgium (Flanders), in the Nord department of France, in western Germany (Lower Rhine), as well as in Suriname, South Africa, and Namibia. A transitional zone between Low Franconian and Central Franconian is formed by the so-called Meuse-Rhenish dialects located in southern Dutch Limburg and the German Lower Rhine.

Middle or Central Franconian

The Central Franconian dialects are spoken in the German states of South-Western North Rhine-Westphalia, most of Rhineland-Palatinate, Saarland, the bordering French Moselle department, and in Luxembourg, as well as by the Transylvanian Saxons in Romania.

Rhine Franconian

The Rhine Franconian dialects are spoken in the German states of Rhineland-Palatinate, Saarland, northern Baden-Württemberg, southern Hesse, northern Bavaria, in the bordering French Moselle department, as well as by the Pennsylvania Dutch in North America.

East Franconian 

The East Franconian dialects are transitional dialects between Central- and Upper German.

The East Franconian dialect branch is one of the most spoken dialect branches in Germany. These dialects are mainly spoken in the region of Franconia. Franconia consists of the Bavarian districts of Upper-, Middle-, and Lower Franconia, the region of South Thuringia (Thuringia), and the eastern parts of the region of Heilbronn-Franken (Tauber Franconia and Hohenlohe) in Baden-Württemberg. The easternmost Franconian-speaking areas are the Saxon parts of Vogtland, in whose central parts East Franconian (Core Vogtlandian), and in whose eastern parts transitional dialects (North Vogtlandian and Southeast Vogtlandian) are spoken. The East Franconian dialects are the only Franconian dialects that are referred to as "Franconian" by their speakers. Only the speakers in Saxon Vogtland refer to their dialects as "Vogtlandian" rather than "Franconian". The largest cities in the East Franconian dialect area are Nuremberg and Würzburg.

South Franconian

South Franconian is mainly spoken in northern Baden-Württemberg in Germany, but also in the northeasternmost part of the region of Alsace in France. While these dialects are considered as dialects of German in Baden-Württemberg, they are considered as dialects of Alsatian in Alsace (the other Alsatian dialects are either Alemannic or Rhine Franconian). The South Franconian dialects are colloquially referred to by their speakers as "Badian" in the Badian parts, and as "Unterländisch" (the Unterland being the region around Heilbronn) or "Swabian" (because of strong influences from the capital Stuttgart, where Swabian dialects are spoken) in the Württembergian parts of Baden-Württemberg. The largest cities in the South Franconian dialect area are Karlsruhe and Heilbronn.

See also
 Old Frankish
 Low Franconian languages
 Low Dietsch dialects
 East Central German

References

Bibliography
 
 
 
 
 
 

West Germanic languages
Dutch language
 
 
Upper German languages
German dialects
Frankish people
Languages of the Netherlands
Languages of Belgium
Languages of France
Languages of Luxembourg
Languages of Suriname
Languages of Namibia
Languages of South Africa